Arbab Jahandad Khan is a Pakistani politician hailing from Peshawar, who served as a member of the Provincial Assembly of Khyber Pakhtunkhwa from May 2013 to May 2018 and from August 2018 to January 2023, belonging to the Pakistan Tehreek-e-Insaf.

Political career
Khan was elected as the member of the Khyber Pakhtunkhwa Assembly on ticket of Pakistan Tehreek-e-Insaf from PK-09 (Peshawar-IX) in 2013 Pakistani general election.

He hurled a shoe at MPA-elect Baldev Kumar in Khyber Pakhtunkhwa Assembly on 27 February 2018.

References

Living people
Pashtun people
Khyber Pakhtunkhwa MPAs 2013–2018
People from Peshawar
Pakistan Tehreek-e-Insaf MPAs (Khyber Pakhtunkhwa)
Year of birth missing (living people)